Joachim II (1802 – 5 August 1878) was Ecumenical Patriarch of Constantinople from 1860 to 1863 and from 1873 to 1878.

References

Clergy from Chios
1802 births
1878 deaths
Bishops of Ioannina
19th-century Ecumenical Patriarchs of Constantinople